University of Nevada Reno Historic District on the campus of the University of Nevada, Reno is a  historic district that was listed on the National Register of Historic Places (NRHP) on February 25, 1987. It includes works by architects Stanford White and Frederick J. DeLongchamps. It includes 13 contributing buildings and two other contributing structures, including two separately NRHP-listed buildings, the Mackay School of Mines Building and Morrill Hall.
The 13 historic buildings are:
Morrill Hall (1886)
Lincoln Hall (1896)
Manzanita Hall (1896)
Mackay School of Mines (1908)
Jones Visitors Center (1914)
Veterinary Building (1914)
Peter Frandsen Humanities Building (1918)
Thompson Student Services Center (1920)
Physical Plant (1921)
Clark Administration (1927)
Mackay Science Hall (1930)
Palmer Engineering Building (1941)
Gymnasium (1945) (of "exceptional significance to the district")
and the two other contributing elements are
University Quadrangle
Manzanita Lake

References

1987 establishments in Nevada
Buildings and structures in Reno, Nevada
Historic districts on the National Register of Historic Places in Nevada
History of Reno, Nevada
Jeffersonian Revival architecture
National Register of Historic Places in Reno, Nevada
Second Empire architecture in Nevada
University and college buildings on the National Register of Historic Places in Nevada
University of Nevada, Reno